The Paratrooper Battalion 261 (Fallschirmjägerbataillon 261) was one of the three combat battalions of the German Army's Airborne Brigade 26, which was a part of the Special Operations Division. Paratrooper  Battalion 261 was fully airmobile and could act both as air assault infantry or be dropped by parachute into the area of operations.

History 

The battalion was activated as Airborne Infantry Battalion 9 (Luftlandejägerbataillon 9) on September 3, 1956, being the first combat battalion of the now defunct Airborne Brigade 25. Since 1961, the headquarters of the battalion have been hosted in Lebach. The arsenal of the battalion was attacked and robbed in 1969. Four of the sentries were killed in cold blood. 
The unit temporarily belonged to the multiliteral AMF(L) Brigade. It has taken part in overseas operations since 1993 when large parts of the battalion deployed to Somalia. Since then, Paratrooper Battalion 261 has taken part in numerous operations all over the globe and spent much time in northern Afghanistan battling the resurgent Taliban insurgency. In 2007, thirty troops received the great honour of an invitation to the French Bastille Day parade.

Following a restructuring of the German armed forces, the battalion was disbanded on 31 March 2015 and merged into the newly raised Paratrooper Regiment 26.

Structure 
 Paratrooper Battalion 261
 Command- and support company
 K9 platoon
 Scout platoon
 2nd Parachute Infantry Company
 3rd Parachute Infantry Company
 4th Parachute Infantry Company
 5th Fire Support Company
 6th Parachute Infantry Company (Training and Force Protection)

External links 
Official Website of Paratrooper Battalion 261

See also
Special Operations Division (Germany)
Fallschirmjäger
Kunduz Province Campaign
Maroon beret

References

Battalions of the Bundeswehr
Airborne infantry battalions
Military units and formations established in 1956
1956 establishments in Germany
Airborne units and formations of Germany
Military units and formations disestablished in 2015